The Pharmacists' Defence Association is a not-for-profit membership organisation that supports the needs of individual pharmacists, pharmacy students and pharmacy undergraduates in the United Kingdom. Membership of the PDA includes insurance, union membership and defence association benefits, which all aim to assist and support pharmacists in their working lives. In November 2018, the PDA reported having more than 28,000 members. in the United Kingdom.  The National Association of Women Pharmacists became a semi-autonomous network within the association in 2019.

The PDA Union
The PDA Union is an independent trade union. that runs parallel to the PDA and has its own democratic structure and rules. The union exists to give pharmacists an independent voice at work.

Safer Pharmacies Charter
The Safer Pharmacies Charter was produced by PDA members and consists of seven commitments to improve patient safety through better working conditions for pharmacists.

Elizabeth Lee
Elizabeth Lee was a pharmacist who was given a 3-month suspended prison sentence for an inadvertent dispensing error at a Tesco pharmacy in 2007, reduced to a £300 fine on appeal in 2010. Her case received national media attention and was the catalyst of a substantial national effort in the UK to decriminalize inadvertent dispensing errors. She was defended by the Pharmacists' Defence Association between 2007 and 2010. The case has been used since that time in pharmacy education as an aid to explain the legislation applicable to the supply of medicines by pharmacists in the UK.

Pharmacist independent prescribers
In 2019 the association issued urgent guidance to its members after several serious incidents, including fatalities, involving pharmacist independent prescribers working in GP practices prescribing inappropriately or offering poor advice. They were particularly concerned about prescribing and clinical advice for patients who were not physically present, or without reference to clinical records and for walk-in patients where a diagnosis might be needed.  They were also concerned about employers in online pharmacies expecting prescription of high-risk medicines, like controlled drugs, without reference to the patient’s GP.

See also
List of pharmacy organizations in the United Kingdom

References

External links 
 Official site
 Safer Pharmacies Charter
 Wider than Medicines

Health in Birmingham, West Midlands
Organisations based in Birmingham, West Midlands
Pharmacy organisations in the United Kingdom